In the National Football League (NFL) a receiver is said to have won the triple crown if they lead the league in receptions, receiving yards and receiving touchdowns within a particular season. Finishing joint first in any or all of those three categories is also considered sufficient. The term triple crown has been used to describe the feat at least as far back as 1990, when it was achieved by Jerry Rice.

Since the NFL began keeping statistics in 1932, the triple crown has been won sixteen times by twelve different players. This includes one player (Lance Alworth) who did so in the American Football League (AFL), the NFL having adopted AFL records when the two leagues merged in 1970. Don Hutson of the Green Bay Packers is the only man to win more than one triple crown, having done so five times (1936, 1941–45). The most recent triple crown winner was Cooper Kupp of the Los Angeles Rams, in 2021.

NFL and AFL receivers who have won the triple crown 

<div style="display:inline-table; vertical-align:top;">

References

Receptions leaders
National Football League lists